Surendran is a given name and a surname. Notable people with the name include:

Given name:
Surendran Nair (born 1956), Indian artist
V. Surendran Pillai, minister for Ports and Youth Affairs in the government of Kerala, India
Surendran Ravindran (born 1987), Malaysian football player
Surendran Reddy (1962–2010), South African composer and pianist

Surname:
A. R. Surendran (died 2016), Sri Lankan Tamil lawyer and President's Counsel
C. P. Surendran (born 1956), poet, novelist and journalist from India
Chengara Surendran (born 1968), member of the 14th Lok Sabha of India
D. Surendran (born 1980), Malaysian footballer
K. Surendran (1921–1997), Indian novelist who wrote in Malayalam
Kadakampally Surendran, Indian communist politician in the Government of Kerala
M. Surendran, Indian politician and former Member of the Legislative Assembly of Tamil Nadu
N. Surendran, Malaysian lawyer and politician
Nikhilesh Surendran (born 1992), Indian first-class cricketer
P. Surendran (born 1961), Indian writer, columnist, art critic and a philanthropist
R. Surendran (born 1982), Malaysian footballer
Saji Surendran, Indian film director in Malayalam films, notably Ivar Vivahitharayal

See also
Surena
Surendra
Surendranath

Tamil masculine given names